George Halifax Lumley-Savile, 3rd Baron Savile (24 January 1919 – 2 June 2008) was an English landowner, member of the House of Lords, and president of the Country Landowners Association.

George Halifax Lumley-Savile was the elder son of John Savile Lumley-Savile, 2nd Baron Savile and inherited the title upon the latter's death in 1931. Lumley-Savile was a member of the House of Lords for 60 years and enjoyed attending the meetings of the House until the House of Lords Act 1999 denied hereditary peers their seats in the House. 

In 1938, aged 19, Lord Savile, with promptings by his mother, sold the family seat at Rufford Abbey. He was sent to Ludgrove for prep school and then spent "four happy years" at Eton from 1932 to 1936. George and his younger brother Henry both won the Harmsworth Music Prize at Eton.

George Savile gave in 1950 large areas of Hardcastle Crags to the National Trust and gave in 1960 Popples Common and adjacent moorland near Heptonstall to Hepton Rural District Council. He was a devout Anglican and patron of Emley Parish Church. He never married. His nephew, John Anthony Thornhill Lumley-Savile, inherited the title upon George's death in 2008 and the next year put Gryce Hall and Walshaw Lodge up for sale.

References

1919 births
2008 deaths
People educated at Eton College
Barons in the Peerage of the United Kingdom
Duke of Wellington's Regiment officers
British Army personnel of World War II
People educated at Ludgrove School
Savile